Intercity Train eXpress-Cheongchun abbreviated as ITX-Cheongchun is a class of train operated by Korail, the national railroad of South Korea, it was introduced on February 28, 2012. ITX-Cheongchun is the successor of the Gyeongchun Line Mugunghwa-ho which operated until December 2010. It is the only Limited express in Korea, and offers services comparable to those in Japan. In fact, it is known to benchmarking Japan's Limited express. Also, Korea's first double-decker coach was applied. This train connects Seoul, Guri, Namyangju, Gapyeong and Chuncheon. The ITX-Cheongchun trains have a faster average speed of 180 kilometers per hour.

Regular services
After the abolition of the Gyeongchun Line Mugunghwa-ho, which ran until December 2010, the ITX-Cheongchun Limited express has been in service since February 28, 2012.

As of July 9, 2021, ITX Cheongchun operates 18 round trips 
weekdays, 30 round trips Saturdays, 27 round trips Sundays and public holidays. All trains operate on the Gyeongchun Line, Gyeongwon Line, and Jungang Line.

Stops

Stations served 
 No brackets denote stations that most or all ITX-Cheongchun services stop.
 Square brackets【】 indicate stations / sections of direct trains of the ITX-Cheongchun service.(The direct train No.2101 leaves Yongsan Station at 10 p.m. and No.2102 leaves Chuncheon Station at 17:07 p.m.)
 Round brackets denote stations that some ITX-Cheongchun services stop.
ITX-Cheongchun (YongsanーChuncheon):
【Yongsan】 - Oksu - Wangsimni - 【Cheongnyangni】 - (Sangbong) - (Toegyewon) - (Sareung) - Pyeongnaehopyeong - (Maseok) -  Cheongpyeong - 【Gapyeong】 - Gangchon - 【Namchuncheon】 - 【Chuncheon】

Rolling stock

 Korail Class 368000 (since February 2012)

Formations 

There are standing seats near the entrance door.
1F Non-reserved seats for Car No.4 and No.5 are open only on weekdays and reserved seats are on weekends. Tickets are divided into reserved, non-reserved and standing seats.
The rolling stock was manufactured by Hyundai Rotem;

Interior
seats in 2+2 abreast configuration.

References

External links
About ITX-Cheongchun (Korail) 

Korail
Electric multiple units of South Korea